Carlo dei baroni Nasi (19 September 1877 – 29 January 1935) was a sailor from Italy, who represented his country at the 1924 Summer Olympics in Le Havre, France. He married Aniceta Caterina (1889–1928) of the Agnelli family. She was daughter of Giovanni Agnelli, the founder of the Fiat automobile empire.

References

Sources
 
 

Italian male sailors (sport)
Sailors at the 1924 Summer Olympics – 6 Metre
Olympic sailors of Italy
1877 births
1935 deaths
Sportspeople from Turin
Carlo